The Tailor (Il sarto, 1565–1570), by Giovanni Battista Moroni, is a 16th-century portrait of a member of the Fenaroli family, who is represented as a tailor practising his art during the work day. Portraits of important persons and personages of Italy — merchants, aristocrats, and nobles — were the representational speciality of the artist Giovanni Battista Moroni, given that his influences included Tiziano and Lorenzo Lotto, and painterly tutelage under Moretto da Brescia. 

In 2008, The Tailor was displayed in the Museo del Prado, Madrid, in an exposition of Renaissance-era portraits; and currently is at the National Gallery of London, in the United Kingdom.

References
Olivar, M., Cien obras maestras de la pintura. Biblioteca Basica Salvat. 1971. 

Renaissance paintings
Collections of the National Gallery, London
Portraits by Italian artists
Paintings by Giovanni Battista Moroni
Italian tailors
1560s paintings
Portraits of men